Philip Sharp may refer to:

 Phil Sharp (screenwriter) (1911–1980), American screenwriter
 Phil Sharp (yachtsman) (born 1981), British speed sailor and engineer
 Philip Sharp (politician) (born 1942), American politician
 Philip Sharp (referee) (born 1964), English football official
 Philip Sharp (Royal Navy officer) (1913–1988), British admiral
 Phillip Allen Sharp (born 1944), American molecular biologist

See also
 Phil Sharpe (disambiguation)